Duncan Robert Fisher (August 30, 1927 – September 22, 2017) was a Canadian professional ice hockey player who played 275 games in the National Hockey League from 1947 to 1953 and again in 1958 to 1959. He played for the New York Rangers, Boston Bruins, and Detroit Red Wings.

From 1946 to 1947 he played with the Regina Pats and Regina Capitals, 1950 to 1951 with St. Paul Saints and from 1952-1953 as well as 1956-1960 with Hershey Bears and played on the Conference Championships and Calder Cup Finals. From 1962 to 1964 he was coach with the Regina St. Pats. After retiring from hockey, Fisher remained in Regina to work in sales with Staseson Decorating and International Paints and then worked at the City of Regina as manager of the Lawson Aquatic Centre and later managing the city's aquatics where he retired. Fisher died in the city in 2017.

Career statistics

Regular season and playoffs

Honours
 2011 Saskatchewan Sports Hall of Fame
 2014 Hershey Bears Hall of Fame in 2014

References

External links

1927 births
2017 deaths
Boston Bruins players
Canadian ice hockey right wingers
Detroit Red Wings players
Hershey Bears players
Ice hockey people from Saskatchewan
New Haven Ramblers players
New York Rangers players
Regina Pats players
St. Paul Saints (USHL) players
Sportspeople from Regina, Saskatchewan